We Is is an album by American jazz percussionist Kahil El'Zabar and saxophonist David Murray, which was recorded live in 2000 at the Bop Shop record store in Rochester and released on Delmark.

Reception

In his review for AllMusic, Scott Yanow states "This adventurous and well-constructed live set holds one's interest throughout and is well worth several listens."

The JazzTimes review by Chris Kelsey notes "Murray's been hotter, but it's great to hear him again in a stripped-down context. And it's great to hear El'Zabar, period."

Track listing
All compositions by Kahil El'Zabar except as indicated
 "Groove Allure" – 14:03
 "We Is" (El'Zabar / Murray) – 9:32
 "Blues Affirmation" – 18:03
 "One World Family" (El'Zabar / Murray) – 10:56
 "Sweet Meat" – 8:35

Personnel
Kahil El'Zabar – drums, percussion
David Murray – tenor sax, bass clarinet

References

2004 live albums
Kahil El'Zabar live albums
Delmark Records live albums